Multiclavula petricola is a species of saxicolous (rock-dwelling) basidiolichen in the family Hygrophoraceae. Found in Japan, it was formally described as a new species in 2020 by Hiroshi Masumoto and Yousuke Degawa. The lichen makes tiny white fruitbodies and has a globular thallus. It is only known from the type locality. The photobiont partner of the lichen is the green algae that lives on the rock surface. The Latin species epithet petricola means "dweller on rocks". The Japanese name Iwa-no-shira-tsuno combines the Japanese words iwa-no ("on rocks") with shira ("white") and tsuno ("horns").

References

Hygrophoraceae
Lichen species
Basidiolichens
Lichens described in 2020
Lichens of Japan